Antonius de Butrio (1338–1408), also called Antonio da Butrio, was an Italian jurist and a noted teacher of law at Bologna.

He composed numerous commentaries to the Decretals of Gregory IX and the Liber Sextus, which provide a comprehensive impression of the contemporary practice of canon and civil law.  In 1408, he also negotiated on behalf of Gregory XII about the end of the Western Schism.

Francesco Zabarella was one of his students.

Works

References

External links
 

1338 births
1408 deaths
14th-century Italian jurists
Canon law jurists
15th-century Italian jurists